Géza Fodor may refer to:

Géza Fodor (mathematician) (1927–1977), Hungarian mathematician
Géza Fodor (philosopher) (1943–2008), Hungarian art and literary critic